Louis Dannoux (24 November 1900 – 28 May 1970) was a French weightlifter. He competed in the men's heavyweight event at the 1924 Summer Olympics.

References

External links
 

1900 births
1970 deaths
French male weightlifters
Olympic weightlifters of France
Weightlifters at the 1924 Summer Olympics
Place of birth missing